In set theory, Silver machines are devices used for bypassing the use of fine structure in proofs of statements holding in L.  They were invented by set theorist Jack Silver as a means of proving global square holds in the constructible universe.

Preliminaries
An ordinal  is *definable from a class of ordinals X if and only if there is a formula  and  such that  is the unique ordinal for which  where for all  we define  to be the name for  within .

A structure  is eligible if and only if:

 .
 < is the ordering on On restricted to X.

Let  be two eligible structures which have the same function k.  Then we say  if  and  we have:

Silver machine
A Silver machine is an eligible structure of the form  which satisfies the following conditions:

Condensation principle.  If  then there is an  such that .

Finiteness principle.  For each  there is a finite set  such that for any set  we have

 

Skolem property.

References

Constructible universe